Hombre sintetizador is the second album released by Mexican Avanzada Regia rock band Zurdok. They left behind the heavy sounds of Antena to a more experimental tunes, adding classical instruments and folk sounds. It is considered one of the best albums of rock en español of all-time and made Zurdok into one of the most popular Mexican bands of the ends of the 1990s. Four official singles were released alongside the record: "Abre los ojos", "Si me advertí", "¿Cuántos pasos?" and "Luna".

Track listing
Hombre sintetizador I 	– 3:04
Abre los ojos 	– 3:35
Si quieres llegar muy lejos – 3:09
¿Cuántos pasos? – 3:07
No encuentro la manera – 4:45
...De llegar al final – 4:38
Hombre sintetizador II – 12:10
Si me advertí – 3:34
El tiempo se va I – 3:11
Tal vez – 3:35
El tiempo se va II – 0:34
Espacio – 3:09
Nos vemos en la Luna – 2:56
Luna – 5:20
¿Cuántos pasos? (acoustic) – 3:58

References

1999 albums